Ravensworth was a railway station on the Main North railway line in New South Wales.  It opened in 1869, initially as Camberwell, and closed to passenger services in 1975. It was an island platform and was subsequently completely demolished after closure.

References 

Disused regional railway stations in New South Wales
Railway stations in the Hunter Region
Railway stations in Australia opened in 1869
Railway stations closed in 1975
1975 disestablishments in Australia
Main North railway line, New South Wales